Denise Scott Brown (née Lakofski; born October 3, 1931) is an American architect, planner, writer, educator, and principal of the firm Venturi, Scott Brown and Associates in Philadelphia. Scott Brown and her husband and partner, Robert Venturi, are regarded as among the most influential architects of the twentieth century, both through their architecture and planning, and theoretical writing and teaching.

Biography

Born to Jewish parents Simon and Phyllis (Hepker) Lakofski, Denise Lakofski had the vision from the time she was five years old that she would be an architect. Pursuing this goal, she spent her summers working with architects, and from 1948 to 1952, after attending Kingsmead College, studied in South Africa at the University of the Witwatersrand. She briefly entered liberal politics, but was frustrated by the lack of acceptance of women in the field. Lakofski traveled to London in 1952, working for the modernist architect Frederick Gibberd. She continued her education there, winning admission to the Architectural Association School of Architecture to learn “useful skills in the building of a just South Africa,” within an intellectually rich environment which embraced women. She was joined there by Robert Scott Brown, whom she had met at Witwatersrand in 1954, and graduated with a degree in architecture in 1955.

Denise Lakofski and Robert Scott Brown were married on July 21, 1955. The couple spent the next three years working and traveling throughout Europe and part of their trip was to Italy with an itinerary devised by their close friend, the architectural historian Robin Middleton with whom they had studied in South Africa and met up with again in London. In 1958, they moved to Philadelphia, Pennsylvania, to study at the University of Pennsylvania's planning department. In 1959, Robert died in a car accident. Denise Scott Brown completed her master's degree in city planning in 1960 and, upon graduation, became a faculty member at the university.

Academic career
While teaching, she completed a master's degree in architecture.  At a 1960 faculty meeting, she argued against demolishing the university's library (now the Fisher Fine Arts Library), designed by Philadelphia architect Frank Furness. At the meeting, she met Robert Venturi, a young architect and fellow professor. The two became collaborators and taught courses together from 1962 to 1964. Scott Brown left the University of Pennsylvania in 1965. Becoming known as a scholar in urban planning, she taught at the University of California, Berkeley, and was then named co-chair of the Urban Design Program at the University of California, Los Angeles. During her years in the Southwest, Scott Brown became interested in the newer cities of Los Angeles and Las Vegas. She invited Venturi to visit her classes at UCLA, and in 1966 asked him to visit Las Vegas with her. The two were married in Santa Monica, California, on July 23, 1967. Scott Brown moved back to Philadelphia in 1967 to join Robert Venturi's firm, Venturi and Rauch, and became principal in charge of planning in 1969.  Denise Scott Brown later taught at Yale University, where she developed courses that encouraged architects to study problems in the built environment employing both traditional empirical methods of social science but also media studies and pop culture. In 2003 she was a visiting lecturer with Venturi at Harvard University's Graduate School of Design.

Architecture and planning

In 1972, with Venturi and Steven Izenour, Scott Brown wrote Learning From Las Vegas: the Forgotten Symbolism of Architectural Form. The book published studies of the Las Vegas Strip, undertaken with students in an architectural research studio course which Scott Brown taught with Venturi in 1970 at Yale's School of Architecture and Planning. The book coined the terms "Duck" and "Decorated Shed" as applied to opposing architectural styles. Scott Brown has remained a prolific writer on architecture and urban planning.  The book joined Venturi's previous Complexity and Contradiction in Architecture (Museum of Modern Art, 1966) as a rebuke to orthodox modernism and elite architectural tastes, and a pointed acceptance of American sprawl and vernacular architecture.

Scott Brown and Venturi strove for understanding the city in terms of social, economic and cultural perspectives, viewing it as a set of complex systems upon planning. As part of their design process, the Venturi, Scott Brown & Associates firm studies the trends of an area, marking future expansions or congestions. These studies influence plans and design makeup. Such an approach was used for their Berlin Tomorrow Competition, putting the population movement and daily pattern in consideration. Similarly, the Bryn Mawr College plan took into consideration the landmark of the early campus and the usages of campus space prior to planning.
Scott Brown holds a systematic approach to planning in what is coined as “FFF studios.” In it, form, forces and function determine and help define the urban environment. For example, the Venturi, Scott Brown & Associates firm studied both the expansion of Dartmouth College campus along with the wilderness surrounding the perimeter of the area.

The fusion of Eastern and Western ideas in the Nikko hotel chain are evident by merging the Western notion of comfort (62 Stanislaus Von Moos) with historical kimono patterns with their hidden order. The architecture applies a post-Las Vegas modern feel while projecting the traditional Japanese shopping street. Guest rooms are typically made with Western taste, with fabrics, wallpaper, and carpet exclusively from the Venturi, Scott Brown & Associates firm that reflect the scenery outside. In contrast, the exterior “street” complex reflects Japanese urban and traditional life.

With the firm, renamed Venturi, Rauch and Scott Brown in 1980, and finally Venturi, Scott Brown and Associates in 1989, Scott Brown has led major civic planning projects and studies, and more recently has directed many university campus planning projects. By the beginning of the 1980s, Venturi and Brown had made huge success with their ideas and concepts. Critics characterized them as the most influential and visionary architects of the time and continued their path with a clear approach, with their radical theories of design. She has also served as principal-in-charge with Robert Venturi on the firm's larger architectural projects, including the Sainsbury Wing of London's National Gallery, the capitol building in Toulouse and the Nikko Hotel and Spa Resort in Japan.

Pritzker Prize controversy

When Robert Venturi was named as winner of the 1991 Pritzker Architecture Prize, Scott Brown did not attend the award ceremony in protest. The prize organization, the Hyatt Foundation, stated that, in 1991, it honored only individual architects, a practice that changed in 2001 with the selection of Jacques Herzog and Pierre de Meuron. However, the award was given to two recipients in 1988.

In 2013, Women In Design, a student organization spearheaded by Caroline Amory James and Arielle Assouline-Lichten at the Harvard Graduate School of Design started a petition for Scott Brown to receive joint recognition with her partner Robert Venturi. When awarded the Jane Drew Prize in 2017 Scott Brown referred to the Pritzker controversy and subsequent petition saying "I was very touched by the Pritzker petition – and that is my prize in the end. 20,000 people wrote from all over the world and every one of them called me Denise."

Room at the top 
In 1989, Scott Brown published her famous essay, "Room at the Top? Sexism and the Star System in Architecture". Although Scott Brown wrote the essay in 1975, she decided not to publish it at the time, out of fear for damaging her career. The essay describes her struggle to be recognized as an equal partner of the firm, in an architecture world that was predominantly male. She has since been an advocate for Women in Architecture and has spoken out about discrimination within the profession on several accounts.

Architecture projects
 Undergraduate Science Building, Life Sciences Institute and Palmer Commons complex University of Michigan; Ann Arbor, Michigan (2005)
 Brown University Campus Life Plan; Providence, Rhode Island (2004)
 Tsinghua University Campus Plan Suggestions; Beijing, China (2004)
 Baker-Berry Library, Dartmouth College; Hanover, New Hampshire (2002)
 Radcliffe Institute for Advanced Study at Harvard University Campus Plan; Boston, Massachusetts (2002)
 Williams College Campus Plan; Williamstown, Massachusetts (2001)
 Frist Campus Center, Princeton University; New Jersey (2000)
 Rauner Special Collections Library, Dartmouth College; Hanover, New Hampshire (2000)
 Perelman Quadrangle, University of Pennsylvania; Philadelphia (2000)
 Provincial Capitol Building; Toulouse, France (1999)
 Gonda (Goldschmied) Neurosciences and Genetics Research Center, UCLA; Los Angeles, California (1998)
 University of Michigan Campus Plan; Ann Arbor, Michigan (1997–2005)
 Bryn Mawr College Campus Plan; Bryn Mawr, Pennsylvania (1997)
 Mielparque Nikko Kirifuri Resort; Nikko National Park, Japan (1997)
 Museum of Contemporary Art, San Diego; La Jolla, California (1996)
 Denver Civic Center Plan; Denver, Colorado (1995)
 Charles P. Stevenson, Jr. Library, Bard College; Annandale-on-Hudson, New York (1994)
 Children's Museum; Houston, Texas (1992)
 Sainsbury Wing, National Gallery, London; United Kingdom (1991)
 Seattle Art Museum; Seattle, Washington (1991)
 Restoration of the Fisher Fine Arts Library, University of Pennsylvania; Philadelphia (1991)
 University of Pennsylvania Campus Planning; Philadelphia (1988–2000)
 Center City Development Plan; Memphis, Tennessee (1987)
 Lewis Thomas Laboratory; Princeton University, New Jersey (1986)
 Gordon Wu Hall; Princeton University, New Jersey (1983)
 Hennepin Avenue Transit/Entertainment Study; Minneapolis, Minnesota (1981)
 Jim Thorpe Historic District Planning Study; Jim Thorpe, Pennsylvania (1979)
 Washington Avenue Revitalization Plan; Miami Beach, Florida (1978)
 Best Products Catalog Showroom; Langhorne, Pennsylvania, (1978)
 Allen Memorial Art Museum, Oberlin College; Oberlin, Ohio (1976)
 Basco Showroom; Philadelphia (1976)
 Franklin Court; Philadelphia (1976)
 South Street "Crosstown Community" Planning; Philadelphia (1970)
 Shanghai High-rise skyscraper office towers; Shanghai, China (2003)
 U.S. Embassy Competition for U.S. Embassy in Berlin; Berlin (1995)

Awards and recognition
 Jane Drew Prize; 2017
 European Cultural Centre Architecture Award; 2016
 AIA Gold Medal; 2016 (with Robert Venturi)
 Edmund N. Bacon Prize, Philadelphia Center for Architecture; 2010
 Design Mind Award, Cooper-Hewitt National Design Awards; 2007 (with Robert Venturi)
 Athena Medal, Congress for the New Urbanism; 2007
 Vilcek Prize in Architecture, The Vilcek Foundation; 2007
Membership, American Philosophical Society; 2006
 The Carpenters' Company Master Builder Award; 2005
 Harvard Radcliffe Institute Medal; 2005
 Visionary Woman Award , Moore College of Art & Design; 2003
 Vincent Scully Prize, National Building Museum; 2002 (with Robert Venturi)
 Topaz Medallion, American Institute of Architects; 1996
 National Medal of Arts, United States Presidential Award; 1992 (with Robert Venturi)
 Chicago Architecture Award, 1987
 ACSA (Association of Collegiate Schools of Architecture) Distinguished Professor Award;  1986-87
 AIA Firm Award, to Venturi, Rauch and Scott Brown; 1985

Alongside Phyllis Lambert, Blanche Lemco van Ginkel and Cornelia Oberlander, she is one of four prominent female architects profiled in the 2018 documentary film City Dreamers.

Published works
 Denise Scott Brown, Having Words (London: Architectural Association, 2009)
 Denise Scott Brown, Room at the top? Sexism and the Star System in Architecture, 1989, in: RENDELL, J., PENNER, B. and BORDEN, I. (ed.): Gender Space Architecture. An Interdisciplinary Introduction, Routhledge, New York, 2000, p 258-265
 Learning from Las Vegas: the Forgotten Symbolism of Architectural Form, (with Robert Venturi and Steven Izenour), Cambridge:  MIT Press, 1972; revised edition 1977.  
 A View from the Campidoglio:  Selected Essays, 1953–1984, (with Robert Venturi), New York:  Harper & Row, 1984. 
 Urban Concepts, Architectural Design Profile 60: January–February 1990. London: Academy Editions; distributed in U.S. by St. Martin's Press. 
 Architecture as Signs and Systems: for a Mannerist Time (with Robert Venturi), Cambridge: The Belknap Press of Harvard University Press, 2004.  
 The art in waste (article), In:Distoriones urbanas / Urban Distorisions, Madrid: Basurama, 2006.  
 On Public Interior Space (with Maurice Harteveld), In: AA Files 56, London: Architectural Association Publications, 2007.

Bibliography 

 Fixsen, Anna. “The World, as Seen by Denise Scott Brown: A Photography Exhibition on View at the Venice Architecture Biennale Chronicles the Architect’s Fascination with Capturing the Beauty and Banality of Cities.” Architectural Record, no. 9 (September 1, 2016): 53–54.
 Zeiger, Mimi. 2017. “Denise Scott Brown.” Architectural Review 241 (1439): 67–69.
 Frida Grahn (ed.). Denise Scott Brown. In Other Eyes: Portraits of an Architect. Bauverlag, Gütersloh, Berlin / Birkhäuser, Basel 2022 (Bauwelt Fundamente; 176), ISBN 978-3-0356-2624-7.

References

External links

 Design Strategies of Robert Venturi and Denise Scott Brown 
 Robert Venturi and Denise Scott Brown tell their life stories at Web of Stories
 Denise Scott Brown interview
 More info on petition page mentioned in prize section, with press links
 Denise Scott Brown interview on Domus
 Kamin, Blair. "Architecture Gold Medal, Rebutting Pritzker, Goes to Scott Brown and Venturi" December 3, 2015. Chicago Tribune, date accessed December 3, 2015.

Lawson, Bryan. “Robert Venturi and Denise Scott Brown.” In Design in Mind, 93-104. Oxford: Butterworth Architecture, 1994. 

20th-century American architects
20th-century American Jews
Postmodern architects
American women architects
American architecture writers
Architectural theoreticians
Urban theorists
University of Pennsylvania School of Design alumni
University of California, Berkeley faculty
UCLA Luskin School of Public Affairs faculty
Yale University faculty
Architecture educators
Harvard University staff
University of the Witwatersrand alumni
1931 births
Living people
Members of the American Philosophical Society
Zambian emigrants to the United States
Zambian Jews
American women academics
21st-century American Jews
20th-century American women
21st-century American women
Recipients of the AIA Gold Medal
Honorary Fellows of the American Institute of Architects
21st-century American architects